Chan Aye is a Burmese sculptor, installation artist, painter, and writer.

He won the Philip Morris Group of Companies Myanmar Art Awards 2001/2002 and the 2004 Sovereign Annual Contemporary Asia Art Prize.

Selected exhibitions

Solo exhibition
2013 Cheimt & Chan: Collaborate Works, Lokanat Galleries, Yangon, Myanmar

Group exhibitions
2017 Yangon Made My Heart Beat Fast: New Contemporary Art from Myanmar, Karin Weber Gallery, Central, Hong Kong, Hong Kong

Personal life
In 1985, Chan Aye married to the  artist Phyu Mon.

References

Living people
1954 births
Burmese painters
Burmese performance artists
Burmese writers